Pakse International Airport  is one of the few international airports in Laos. Pakse is the former southern capital city of the Kingdom of Champasak.

Facilities
The airport has been in use since 1959 and re-opened after renovations in 2001. A new control tower next to the terminal replaced a short one to provide ATC at the airport. The terminal is designed to mimic the Lan Xang-style architecture used for Buddhist temples in Laos.

Though civilian, the airfield is also used by the military. Lao People's Army barracks and the headquarters of Military Region 4 are next to the airport. The airport is a military airfield for Lao People's Liberation Army Air Force aircraft as a detachment base.

Airlines and destinations

Accidents and incidents
On 16 October 2013, Lao Airlines Flight 301, operated by an ATR 72–600 crashed into the Mekong River on approach to Pakse, killing all 49 people on board. It was later determined that the causes of the crash included pilot error and poor weather.

References

External links

Airports in Laos
Buildings and structures in Champasak province
Airports established in 1959
1959 establishments in Laos